Nagri Tutial (also known as Nagri Totial) is one of the 51 union councils of Abbottabad District in Khyber Pakhtunkhwa province of Pakistan.

Origins of name
Nagri Tutial or the town of the Tutials is named after a Dhund Raja (chief) Toota Khan, who was a son of Doomat Khan.

The Haro River cuts across the village of Nagri Totial.

The village, lies at an elevation of 4,081 feet, and has a unique story to tell. It has seen Hindus and Sikhs co-habit with the Muslims till the partition when they fled in large numbers to India. The remains of the chamber where Hindus used to burn their dead still exist. “We lived together in peace and harmony. But soon after the creation of Pakistan, Hindus and Sikhs left the valley. The villagers provided them a safe escape,” says Mohammad Nasim Qamar, a retired school teacher of the area.

The British used the area it as a summer retreat as many prominent officials of the empire visited the village numerous times.

Mostly hailing from the ‘Totialian’ branch of the Dhund (Abbassi) tribe (named after Raja Toota Khan, an Abbasi chief) in the Hazara division, the villagers of Nagri Totial have settled on a stretch lying south-east of Abbottabad up till Ghora Gali near Murree in the east. Some Qureshis, Awans and Bhattis etc. also live here.

Lora is the closest town to Nagri Totial, and is accessible only by hired jeeps, buses, taxis and personal cars. The nearest police station, the boys’ college, hospital and dozens of union council offices are situated here. The bus station at Lora also services routes to other neighbouring villages. The two roads that connect Nagri Totial with Abbottabad beyond Lora remain unpaved and bumpy. “Millions of rupees have been spent on this project but the road paints a gloomy picture, which says not a single penny was spent and public money was only wasted,” says Kosar Naqvi, a local journalist. Plans envisioned in 1986 to connect these roads to the Grand Trunk Road have not been completed.

Medical facilities in the area are nonexistent. There is a Basic Health Unit, located three kilometers away from the valley in the midst of a jungle. There is one high school for boys and one middle school for girls. “Most of the teachers are absent. They are paid for sitting at homes,” says another local journalist Javed Iqbal. The primary school that was damaged during the 2005 earthquake still awaits restoration he says. The girls thus take classes in the boys’ primary school, which already lacks adequate teaching strength.

Tribes
Most of the people of Nagri Totial are from the 'Totialian' branch of the Dhund Abbasi, Awans, Chaudharies, Gujjars, Mehmood Khanies, and Syeds.

Location 

Nagri Tutial is situated in the south east of the district and forms part of Abbottabad district's frontier with the Punjab (Nagri Tutial's eastern border is with Punjab's Rawalpindi Tehsil). Nagri Tutial shares a border with the following Union Councils within Abbottabad District - to the North and east by Seer Gharbi, to the west by Nara, and to the south by Lora. Nagri Tutial has an average elevation of 1243 metres (4081 feet).

References

Union councils of Abbottabad District